A gillie or ghillie is an assistant who attends to a person who is hunting or fishing in Scotland.

Ghillie, gillie or gille may also refer to:

 Ghillie brogues, a type of brogue shoe
 Ghillie kettle, a type of portable water boiler
 Ghillie suit, a camouflage outfit
 Ghillie shirt, a traditional Scottish style of shirt
 Ghillie Dhu, a Scottish faerie
 Ghillies (dance), shoes used in Irish and Scottish dancing

People 
 Annis Gillie (1900–1985), British physician
 Cecilia Gillie (1907–1996), English radio executive
 Farrand Gillie (1905–1972), Canadian professional ice hockey player
 George W. Gillie (1880–1963), U.S. congressman from Indiana
 Ghillie Basan (born 1962), Scottish food and travel writer
 Gille (singer) (born 1987), Japanese singer
 Gillie Alldis (1920–1998), football wing half
 Gillie Larew (1882–1977), American mathematician
 Gillie Potter (1887–1975), English comedian and broadcaster
 Gillie Schattner (born 1965), of Australian sculptors Gillie and Marc
 Gillie Wilson (1869–1952), Australian cricketer
 Harald Gille (died 1136), Norwegian king
 Herbert Gille (1897–1966), German SS commander
 Jean Gillie (1915–1949), English film actress
 Oliver Gillie (1937–2021), British journalist

Other uses 
 Gillie Hampton, a character in the BBC soap opera EastEnders
 Sheriff v. Gillie, a U.S. Supreme Court case about debt collection practices

See also 
 Gilli (disambiguation)
 Gillies, a Scottish surname